Carry On Teacher is a 1959 British comedy film, the third in the series of 31 Carry On films (1958–1992). It was released at the Plaza Cinema in London on 3 September 1959. It features Ted Ray in his only Carry On role, alongside series regulars; Kenneth Connor, Charles Hawtrey, Kenneth Williams and Hattie Jacques. Leslie Phillips and Joan Sims make their second appearances in the series here, having made their debuts in the previous entry, Carry On Nurse. A young Richard O'Sullivan and Larry Dann – making the first of his four Carry on appearances – turn up as pupils.

Plot
During the current term at Maudlin Street Secondary Modern School, William Wakefield (Ted Ray) – who has been at the school for 20 years – is acting headmaster. He spots an advertisement for a headmaster of a brand new school near where he was born and decides to apply for the post.

Because of a coinciding visit by a Ministry of Education Inspector, Miss Wheeler (Rosalind Knight), and the noted child psychiatrist Alistair Grigg (Leslie Phillips), he decides to enlist the help of his staff to ensure that the school routine runs smoothly during their visit.

While in conference with his teaching staff (including Gregory Adams (Kenneth Connor), science master; Edwin Milton (Kenneth Williams), English master; Michael Bean (Charles Hawtrey), music teacher; Sarah Allcock (Joan Sims), gym mistress and Grace Short (Hattie Jacques), maths teacher); a senior pupil (Robin Stevens, played by Richard O'Sullivan) overhears that Wakefield is planning to leave at the end of term. The pupils are fond of the venerable teacher and Stevens immediately rushes this information to his schoolmates. They plan to sabotage every endeavour that might earn Wakefield praise, which would set him on the road to his new post.

On arrival, Grigg and Miss Wheeler are escorted by Wakefield on a tour of inspection and the pupils go out of their way to misbehave in each class they visit. However Griggs' tour has not been in vain: he has taken a shine to Sarah Allcock, the gym mistress and it is obvious the feeling is mutual.

Miss Wheeler is disgusted at the behaviour of the children towards the teachers, but is softened when she visits the science master's class, where she feels an instinctive maternal affection for the charm of the nervous science master, Adams.

Wakefield realises his position as headmaster of the new school is in jeopardy and, on seeing Miss Wheeler's interest in Adams, enlists his help. He asks Adams to make advances to Miss Wheeler to win her over. Adams is aghast at the thought, but eventually agrees to do his best. After many unsuccessful attempts to tell Miss Wheeler of his love, Adams finds an untruth has become truth and finally finds enough courage to declare his love.

The pupils meanwhile, have been doing everything in their power to make things go wrong, and on the last day of term are caught trying to sabotage the prizegiving. They are told to report to Wakefield's study and after much cross-examination he learns the reason for the week's events – the pupils simply did not want to see him leave. Wakefield – deeply moved – tells the children he will not leave and will see them all next term.

Miss Wheeler, softened by her newfound love, announces that she intends to tell the Ministry that staff-pupil relationships at the school are excellent.

Production Notes
During the filming, Charles Hawtrey's mother would often visit the set. While enjoying a cigarette, she accidentally dropped lit ash from the cigarette into her handbag. Joan Sims, who was the first to spot the incident, yelled, "Charlie, Charlie, your mother's bag is on fire!". Charles Hawtrey poured his cup of tea into the bag, snapped it shut, and carried on chatting as if nothing had happened.

Cast
Ted Ray as Mr William Wakefield
Kenneth Connor as Mr Gregory Adams
Charles Hawtrey as Mr Michael Bean
Leslie Phillips as Mr Alistair Grigg
Kenneth Williams as Mr Edwin Milton
Hattie Jacques as Miss Grace Short
Joan Sims as Miss Sarah Allcock
Rosalind Knight as Miss Felicity Wheeler
Cyril Chamberlain as Mr Alf Hodgson
Richard O'Sullivan as Robin Stevens
George Howell as Billy Haig
Roy Hines as Harry Bird
Diana Beevers as Penny Lee
Jacqueline Lewis as Pat Gordon
Carol White as Sheila Dale
Jane White as Irene Ambrose
Paul Cole as John Atkins
Larry Dann as Pupil
Irene French as Monica (uncredited)

Filming and locations

Filming dates – March 1959

Interiors:
 Pinewood Studios, Buckinghamshire

Exteriors:
 Drayton Green Primary School, Ealing

Reception
Variety called the film "an unabashed collection of uninhibited gag situations and dialog, but this time screenplay writer Norman Hudis has developed a slightly stronger story line and made the characters more credible ... Some of the gags are telegraphed but the cheerful impudence with which they are dropped into the script is completely disarming." Margaret Harford of the Los Angeles Times wrote, "Carry On, Teacher gets a high mark for low comedy in the slapstick fashion of previous japes about doctors, nurses and sergeants. It's silly nonsense but it's fun and that's not telling tales out of school." The Monthly Film Bulletin stated: "Another slapstick farce in the 'Carry On' series which, although predictable and occasionally pressed too hard, still manages to register some adroitly timed humour."

According to Kinematograph Weekly the film performed "better than average" at the British box office in 1959.

Footnotes

Bibliography

Keeping the British End Up: Four Decades of Saucy Cinema by Simon Sheridan (third edition) (2007) (Reynolds & Hearn Books)

External links

Carry On Teacher at The Whippit Inn

1959 films
1959 comedy films
British black-and-white films
Teacher
1950s English-language films
Films about educators
Films directed by Gerald Thomas
Films shot at Pinewood Studios
Films set in schools
Films produced by Peter Rogers
Films with screenplays by Norman Hudis
1950s British films